The Independent American Party of Nevada (IAPN) is a far-right American political party and the Nevada affiliate of the Constitution Party. The party was founded in 1967 and affiliated with the Constitution Party after its forming in 1999. It was one of four Constitution state parties that did not change their names to "Constitution Party".

History

1990's
The Nevada IAPN achieved some electoral success in the 1990s with the election of Chuck Horne as the mayor of Mesquite in a nonpartisan race.

2010
In the 2010 elections, three Independent American Party candidates were elected to local offices and one was re-elected. Several IAPN candidates also performed well in various state and legislative elections, including the election for Nevada State Assembly, District 33, where Janine Hansen won 30.81% of the vote and placed second in a three-way race. The IAP candidate for State Attorney General, Joel Hansen, also secured 7.81% of the vote.

As of the Close of Registration, October 2010, the Independent American Party had a total number of 62,724 registered voters in the Party. 

On October 25, 2013, the party membership experienced a small split with some members staying with the Independent American Party of Nevada and others forming a new Constitution Party of Nevada.

Candidates

Presidential ticket

Gubernatorial

Chairmen
 Daniel Hansen: 1967–1980
 Joel Hansen: 2002–2004 and 2016–?
 Christopher Hansen: 2004–2008
 Mark Andrews: 2008–2009
 John Wagner: 2009–2016
 Janine Hansen: ?-present

References

External links
 The official Independent American Party of Nevada Home Page

Political parties established in 1967
Political parties in Nevada
Far-right political parties in the United States